The former French Catholic diocese of Saint-Omer existed from 1559 until the French Revolution. Its see at Saint-Omer, in the modern department of Pas-de-Calais, was created as a reaction to the destruction of the see of Thérouanne, by military action in the wars of the Emperor Charles V. It then became a suffragan of the Archdiocese of Cambrai in 1559.

By the Concordat of 1801, the diocese of Saint-Omer was united with the diocese of Arras and the diocese of Boulogne, to form an enlarged diocese of Arras.

Bishops
Guillaume de Poitiers 1561
Gérard de Haméricourt 1563-1577
Jean Six 1581-1586
Jacques de Pamèle 1587
Jean de Vernois, O.P., 1591-1599
Jacques Blaseus, O.F.M. Rec., 1600-1618 (previously bishop of Namur)
Paul Boudot 1618-1626 (then bishop of Arras)
Pierre Paunet, O.F.M., 1628-1631
Christophe de Morlet 1632-1633
Christophe de France 1635-1656
Ladislas Jonart 1662-1671 (then archbishop of Cambrai)
Jacques-Théodore de Bryas 1672-1675 (then archbishop of Cambrai)
Jean Charles de Longueval 1676
Pierre Van Den Perre 1577
Armand-Anne-Tristan de La Baume de Suze 1677
Louis-Alphonse de Valbelle 1677-1708 (previously bishop of Alet)
François de Valbelle de Tourves 1708-1727
Joseph-Alphonse de Valbelle de Tourves 1727-1754
Pierre-Joseph de Brunes de Monlouet 1754-1765 (previously bishop of Dol)
Louis-François-Marc-Hilaire de Conzié 1766-1769 (then bishop of Aire)
Joachim-François-Mamert de Conzié 1769-1775 (then archbishop of Tours)
Jean-Auguste de Chastenet de Puységur 1775-1778 (then bishop of Carcassonne)
Alexandre-Joseph-Alexis de Bruyère de Chalabre 1778-1790 (1796)

See also
Catholic Church in France
List of Catholic dioceses in France

Notes

Bibliography

Cochin, Claude (1905).  "Recherches sur Stefano Colonna, prévôt du chapitre de Saint-Omer, cardinal d'Urbain VI et correspondent de Pétrarque," Revue d' histoire et de littérature religeuses 10 (1905) 352-383 ; 554-578.

 pp. 548–549. (Use with caution; obsolete)
  p. 301. (in Latin)
 p. 175.

 p. 219.
 

 
Saint-Omer
Religious organizations established in the 1550s
1559 establishments in France
Dioceses established in the 16th century
1801 disestablishments in France
Saint-Omer